"Nothing but the Truth" is the fourteenth episode of seaQuest DSVs first season. It was originally shown on January 9, 1994.

Quick Overview: In preparation for an experiment, the crew evacuates the seaQuest, leaving only Commander Ford, Lt. Commander Hitchcock, Lieutenant Krieg, Chief Crocker, and Lucas aboard. However, environmental extremists use the seaQuest`s vulnerable state to seize control of the vessel.

Plot

The crew evacuate the seaQuest and prepare to flood it in order to test Captain Bridger's experimental hull-siphons which, in theory, should re-float a sinking ship. Leaving only a skeleton crew aboard, the remaining officers are ordered to pick up the crew of a damaged shuttle from a university just off their bow. However, when the crew rescues the shuttle, a group of mercenaries emerge from the launch bay and attack Chief Crocker and begin to move towards the bridge.

Left alone on the bridge, Lt. Commander Hitchcock manages to disable seaQuest key systems just as she's taken captive by the enemy. Their leader, Colonel Steven Schrader, a radical environmentalist, instructs his men to use seaQuest'''s computer to obtain shut-down codes to various pollutants around the world, such as nuclear reactors, paint manufactures, and the like, with the intent of putting a stop to global pollution by any means necessary. Meanwhile, Commander Ford manages to reach the bridge via Bridger's Folly (the aqua-tubes) and tells Hitchcock to tell the mercenaries the truth, no matter what, in order to control what they know.

Ford is able to locate Lucas, who has taken cover under a deck-plate, and disable three of the mercenaries. Taking one of their uniforms, Ford passes himself off as one of them and is able to free Crocker, Lieutenant Krieg, and two other officers from confinement. Krieg, taking a uniform of his own, and Ford, are able to contact Captain Bridger up-world thanks to Lucas' reprogramming of one of the WSKRs for laser communication. They plan to carry out the original experiment; flood the seaQuest and hope that the mercenaries will be scared off. Meanwhile, Crocker, still injured, attempts to scramble the launch bay systems in order to prevent their escape. Ford also begins to disable the hull-siphons, which will cause the seaQuest to actually sink, thus further tricking the mercenaries.

Lucas is captured and taken to the bridge with Hitchcock as Ford and Krieg make their way into the maglev where they will be able to open a sea valve and begin sinking the seaQuest, the hull-siphons deactivated. Jackson, Schrader's lead mercenary, is able to find them, however, but, is luckily thwarted by Krieg, both of whom are swept up in the current of the water pouring in.

On the bridge, Darwin screams that seaQuest is sinking, causing Schrader to panic and leave, Lucas and Hitchcock in tow. As they arrive at the launch bay, they find that they cannot escape; Crocker having been successful in sabotaging the systems. Lucas attempts to cause a distraction in the hopes that Hitchcock will escape, but, he is restrained. However, he notices he's being held back by Krieg, still dressed as one of Schrader's men, who helps him escape. Schrader agrees to release Hitchcock if Ford will let him go, to which he agrees. However, Schrader fails to realize that with seaQuest sinking, the increased pressure from the added depth will crush his small ship, and he dies as a result. Meanwhile, Lucas and Krieg are able to reactivate Bridger's hull-siphons and re-float the ship.

Background
In all episodes after this one, the clam-doors on the bridge would be equipped with a "zipper"-type seal, in order to protect the bridge from security breaches such as the one that takes place in this episode where Schrader's men use the jaws of life to pry the doors open and seize control of the seaQuest.Bradford Tatum, who guest stars in this episode as Jackson, Colonel Schrader's lead mercenary, would eventually marry Stacy Haiduk, who portrays Lt. Commander Hitchcock. The two of them share a couple of scenes in this episode. Tatum would later act in another navy-based film, portraying naval officer Brad Stepanak in Down Periscope.Roy Scheider (Captain Bridger) had requested his involvement in this episode be reduced so he could portray a Mafia don in Romeo is Bleeding.Ted Raimi (Lieutenant O'Neill), Marco Sanchez (Chief Miguel Ortiz), and Stephanie Beacham (Dr. Kristin Westphalen) do not appear in this episode. Though not appearing in the aired version of the episode, Beacham filmed a scene that was ultimately cut where Dr. Westphalen finds Lucas on the sea deck after the ship has been saved where she gives him a hug and tells him that she was concerned for his safety, to which Lucas offers his thanks. This deleted scene is available on the first season DVD release. Another short deleted scene depicts Chief Crocker crawling through the service crawlways, trying to keep himself from giving up and accomplishing his mission to sabotage the seaQuest.''

References

SeaQuest DSV episodes
1994 American television episodes
Fiction set in 2018